Mohammad Nawaz Abbasi is former justice of the Supreme Court of Pakistan and a former justice of Lahore High Court.

Life
Mohammad Nawaz Abbasi was born in Murree  on 7 June 1943.

He studied Secondary Education in Government High School, Murree and passed Secondary School Examination from Board of Intermediate and Secondary Education, Lahore in 1963. He graduated from University of Punjab in 1967 and did LL.B.  from Punjab University  Lahore (Session 1969–1971). He also diploma in Labour Laws from University Law College, Lahore in 1973 and a Shariah Course from International Islamic University, Islamabad in 1987. Mr. Muhammad Nawaz Abbasi died on january 25, 2023 in Islamabad.

Professional career

Mr Abbasi joined the legal profession and enrolled as an Advocate of subordinate courts with Punjab Bar Council during 1972–73. He enrolled as Advocate High Court in 1975 and as Advocate Supreme Court of Pakistan in 1981.

He worked as a Special Prosecutor, in Court of Special Judge "Customs" Lahore, from 1983 to 1985. From March 1985 to August 1992, he worked as Assistant Advocate General, Punjab. He was a Prosecutor with Special Court for Speedy Trials established in the High Court and Supreme Appellate Court on behalf of Federal Government from 1987 to 1990. He has also conducted arbitration matters before the International Arbitration Tribunal in Germany.

He was a Member Disciplinary Committee, Quaid-i-Azam University.

Mr. Abbasi have also worked as visiting lecturer:
 Police Academy, Sihala (1987–88)
 Muslim Law College, Rawalpindi (1989–90)
 Customs Academy, Karachi (1990–91)
 Federal Judicial Academy, Islamabad.

Mr Abbasi was elevated as Judge of Lahore High Court on 28 August 1992.

He was a member of Administration Committee of Lahore High Court. During 2000–2001, he was Chairman of the Tribunal constituted under Anti-Terrorism Act, 1997. Mr Abbasi was a member of Syndicate Islamia University, Bahawalpur in 2001–2002.

Mr Abbasi was elevated as Judge Supreme Court of Pakistan on 10 January 2002.

He also has been Incharge Judge, Federal Judicial Academy in 2003 and Principal Secretary, Ministry of Law, Justice and Human Rights. He was Incharge, Access to Justice Programme of the Government of Pakistan and ex officio Member of Law & Justice Commission of Pakistan from 18 June 2003 to 14 June 2004.

Mohammad Nawaz Abbasi retired from Supreme Court of Pakistan on 7 June 2007 on reaching retirement age of 65.

Mohammad Nawaz Abbasi retired from Supreme Court of Pakistan. He was then appointed as Chief Judge of Supreme Appellate Court of Gilgit Baltistan.

Oath taking years

Oath 1999

Mr Abbasi as a sitting judge of Lahore High Court took oath in 1999.

Oath 2007

On 3 November 2007, the Chief of the Army Staff declared emergency in Pakistan and issued a Provisional Constitutional Order (PCO).

As sitting judges of Supreme Court of Pakistan, Mr. Abbasi along with Mr. Abdul Hameed Dogar, Mr. M. Javed Buttar, and Mr. Faqir Muhammad Khokhar immediately took the oath on PCO.

On 7 June 2008 Justice Muhammad Nawaz Abbasi retired from Supreme court of Pakistan and in January 2009 he was appointed as Chief Judge Gilgit Baltistan until 15 January 2012.

Important cases

Presidential Election 2007
The candidature for second term of presidential election was directly challenged under the Article 184(3) of the Constitution and requirement of article 184(3) that unless a question  unless a question of public importance relating to fundamental rights is involved, a direct petition before the Supreme Court is not maintainable. The matter relating to candidature of a person  can be challenged in the high court under Article 199 of the constitution. As per majority view the petition seeking relief  to restrain Gen. Pervez Musharraf  from contesting elections was not maintainable because no fundamental right of the person who challenged the candidature was Involved. On 28 September 2007, Javed Iqbal along with Abdul Hameed Dogar, M. Javed Buttar, Muhammad Nawaz Abbasi, Faqir Muhammad Khokhar, and Falak Sher formed a majority opinion in holding that petition challenging General Pervez Musharraf candidature for the second term as the president as non-maintainable. The bench was headed by Justice Rana Bhagwandas, with two other members Justice Sardar Muhammad Raza Khan and Justice Mian Shakirullah Jan dissented

References

Profile from the BBC Urdu service
BBC News about the arrest of Chief Justice Chaudhry

1943 births
Living people
Justices of the Supreme Court of Pakistan
20th-century Pakistani judges
People from Murree
21st-century Pakistani judges